Masina may refer to:

Places
 Masina, Kinshasa, in the Democratic Republic of the Congo
 Masina, alternate name of Tabas-e Masina, in Iran
 Masina, Lumbini, in Nepal
 Masina, Rapti, in Nepal
 Masina, Purulia, West Bengal, India
 Masina Empire, alternate spelling of Massina Empire

People
 Adam Masina (1994–), an Italian footballer
 Giulietta Masina (1921–1994), an Italian film actress

Last names
.masina may refer to last name in Telugu, families from east Godavari district of coastal Andhra Pradesh

See also
Macina (disambiguation)
Messina (disambiguation)